Jorge Alberto Garramuño (14 September 1953 – 7 September 2015) was an Argentine politician who was a Senator for the Fueguian People's Movement between 2013 and 2015. He began his political career as Minister of Public Works of Tierra del Fuego in 1992. He died on 7 September 2015 in Buenos Aires.

References

1953 births
2015 deaths
Fueguino People's Movement politicians
Members of the Argentine Senate for Tierra del Fuego
Members of the Argentine Chamber of Deputies elected in Tierra del Fuego